The N3 or National Highway 3 is a national highway in Ghana that begins at Kpong and runs west through Oterkpalu to Koforidua. It is a link between the N2 and N4 in the Eastern region of the country, with a total distance of 40 kilometers (25 miles).

Route
Major towns and cities along the route of the N3 include Kpong, Suhum, Oterkpalu, and Koforidua. The N3 runs parallel to the Lolo River.

The N3 runs southwest from Kpong, intersecting with the R30 near Somanya before veering north to Oterkpalu, where it intersects with the IR3. From Oterkpalu, the route turns south toward Koforidua, where it intersects with the R42.

See also 
Ghana Road Network

References

Roads in Ghana